Alberto Luis Gomes (29 December 1915 – 16 February 1992) was a Portuguese footballer who played as forward.

Football career 

Gomes gained 2 caps and scored 1 goal for Portugal. He made his debut 28 January 1940 in Paris against France, in a 2-3 defeat.

External links 
 
 

1915 births
People from Monção
Portuguese footballers
Association football forwards
Primeira Liga players
Associação Académica de Coimbra – O.A.F. players
Portugal international footballers
Portuguese football managers
Associação Académica de Coimbra – O.A.F. managers
1992 deaths
Sportspeople from Viana do Castelo District